The St. Anthony Church, is a church first built in 1300, then destroyed in 1971, and eventually rebuilt in the 1990s in the Albanian town of Laç.

History
The site of the church was first built around year 1300, and dedicated to St. Mary, then renamed after Anthony of Padua in 1557. In 1971 it was destroyed by the communist regime, and eventually was rebuilt in the 1990s. It is a  Franciscan church. Many renowned clergy have served in the church, including Shtjefën Gjeçovi, Vinçens Prennushi, Klement Miraj,  Robert Ashta, and Zef Pllumi.

Today, it is a popular tourist attraction. Since the end of communism, attempts have also been made to proselytize the Muslim majority in Albania to Catholicism, and to persuade the Sunni Muslims, as well as Shiite members of the Bektashi Sufi order, to join the treks that annually make their way to the building on June 12.

References

Roman Catholic churches in Albania
Franciscan churches
Churches completed in 1300
Destroyed churches
12th-century Roman Catholic church buildings